Naumburg SC was a German association football club that played in Naumburg, Saxony-Anhalt. The club was founded 29 September 1899 and was the first formed in the city. Part of the Verband Mitteldeutscher Ballspiel-Vereine (VMBV), Naumburg played their home matches at the Vogelwiese ("bird meadow") wearing the team colours of black and white.

Naumburg SC is notable only as a founding member of the German Football Association (Deutscher Fussball Bund or German Football Association) at Leipzig in 1900 as it disappeared from the German football scene early on when the club was dissolved in 1908.
2016 the local traditional clubs Naumburger SV 1905 and Naumburger BC 1920 decided to merge. SC Naumburg will be re-established on 1 July 2017.

Football clubs in Germany
Defunct football clubs in Germany
Association football clubs established in 1899
Association football clubs disestablished in 1908
Defunct football clubs in Saxony-Anhalt
Naumburg (Saale)
1899 establishments in Germany
1908 disestablishments in Germany